Emmanuel Timoni (1669-1718) was a Turkish physician who with Giacomo Pylarini was responsible for introducing the idea of vaccination to the United Kingdom when they independently wrote letters on the subject to The Lancet.

References

External links 
http://worldcat.org/identities/viaf-305320318/

1669 births
1718 deaths
Turkish physicians